Chesconessex is an unincorporated community in Accomack County, Virginia, United States.

References

Unincorporated communities in Virginia
Unincorporated communities in Accomack County, Virginia